Robert Rodriguez is an American politician from the state of Colorado. A Democrat, Rodriguez was elected to the 32nd district of the Colorado Senate in 2018 after winning majority vote. He currently serves as a member of the Senate Committee on Legal Service, Judiciary Committee, Legislative Audit Committee, and is Chair of the Business, Labor, and Technology Committee.

References 

Democratic Party Colorado state senators
People from Denver
Hispanic and Latino American state legislators in Colorado
21st-century American politicians